Castle of Waha is a castle in Waha, Wallonia, Belgium.  It is the main residence of the Duke and Princes of Arenberg in Belgium.

See also
List of castles in Belgium

Castles in Belgium
Castles in Luxembourg (Belgium)
Castle of Waha